Taiwanese Braille is the braille script used in Taiwan for Taiwanese Mandarin (Guoyu). Although based marginally on international braille, most consonants have been reassigned; also, like Chinese Braille, Taiwanese Braille is a semi-syllabary.

An example is,

Charts

Initials 

The braille letters for zhuyin/pinyin ㄍ g, ㄘ c, and ㄙ s double for the alveolo-palatal consonants ㄐ j, ㄑ q, and ㄒ x. The latter are followed by close front vowels, namely ㄧ i and ㄩ ü, so the distinction between g, c, s (or z, k, h) and j, q, x in zhuyin and pinyin is redundant.

Medial + rime 
Each medial + rime in zhuyin is written with a single letter in braille.

 is used for both the empty rime  -i, which is not written in zhuyin, and the rime ㄦ er. See for example 斯 sī located above the word Daguerre in the image at right.

Tone Marks 

Tone is always marked. This includes toneless syllables such as 了 le, rendered lė in the image above-right.

Punctuation marks 
Punctuation

References

External links
國語點字自學手冊, National Taiwan Library
(a copy here)

Innovative braille scripts
Transcription of Chinese
French-ordered braille scripts